Enrico D'Ovidio (1842-1933) was an Italian mathematician who is known by his works on geometry.

Life and work 
D'Ovidio, son of a liberal parents involved in the Italian independence movement, studied at the university of Naples under his uncle, Achille Sannia, who prepared him to enter in the School of Bridges and Roads. In 1869, he published with Sannia a very successful textbook to teach geometry in the schools.

Encouraged by Eugenio Beltrami, he obtained the chair on Algebra and Analytic Geometry at the university of Turin in 1872, and he remained there for the remaining 46 years of his life. He was also rector of the university from 1880 to 1885.

The research of D'Ovidio was mainly in geometry and the most important works were produced when he was in Turin. Specially interesting is his work Le funzioni metriche fondamentali negli spazi di quante si vogliono dimensioni e di curvatura costante (The fundamental metrical functions in the n-dimensional spaces of constant curvature), published in 1876 and where he stated for first time the law of sines in n-dimensional curved spaces.

References

Bibliography

External links 
 
 

19th-century Italian mathematicians
1842 births
1933 deaths